The British cavalry were the first British Army units to see action during the First World War. Captain Hornby of the 4th (Royal Irish) Dragoon Guards is reputed to have been the first British soldier to kill a German soldier, using his sword, and Corporal Edward Thomas of the same regiment is reputed to have fired the first British shot shortly after 06:30 on 22 August 1914, near the Belgian village of Casteau. The following Battle of Mons was the first engagement fought by British soldiers in Western Europe since the Battle of Waterloo, ninety-nine years earlier. In the first year of the war in France nine cavalry brigades were formed for three British cavalry divisions. Other regiments served in six brigades of the two British Indian Army cavalry divisions that were formed for service on the Western Front. Three regiments also fought in the campaign in Mesopotamia, the only other theatre of the First World War where British cavalry served.

The doctrine of the British cavalry had been highly influenced by their experiences in the Second Boer War fifteen years earlier, during which one commander had preferred using irregular units to the professional cavalry regiments. By necessity, cavalry doctrine had changed since then, with emphasis being placed on dismounted firepower and covering fire from the flanks, using machine guns and attached artillery, to support cavalry charges. Cavalrymen dominated the higher command positions within the British Army during the war.  The only officers to command the British Expeditionary Force on the Western Front were both cavalrymen, while the original commander of the British Cavalry Division went on to command the Egyptian Expeditionary Force during the Palestine Campaign, and another cavalryman became the Chief of the Imperial General Staff. Altogether on the Western Front, five of the ten officers who commanded the five British armies were provided by the cavalry, while another ten commanded corps, and twenty-seven served as divisional commanders.

Among other decorations for their valour, eight cavalrymen were awarded the Victoria Cross, Britain's highest award for bravery in the face of the enemy. Three of the awards came in the first month of the war. All but one of the thirty-two British regular army cavalry regiments fought in a recognised theatre of war, either on the Western Front or in the Mesopotamia Campaign, during which over 5,600 cavalrymen were killed, including several senior officers.

Background

The traditional role of cavalry in war is scouting—gathering information about the enemy's location, strength, and movements—while denying the enemy the same information about one's own forces. Other tasks include raiding into enemy territory and damaging their infrastructure and economy while avoiding conflict with enemy forces. On the field of battle, cavalry were expected to charge into and break up enemy infantry and cavalry formations. The prestige gained by participating in a cavalry charge was such that additional officers would attempt to join one whenever possible. Notable examples of this include Louis Nolan of the 15th Hussars joining the Charge of the Light Brigade in the Crimean War and Winston Churchill of the 4th Hussars joining the 21st Lancers for their charge during the Battle of Omdurman.

Since 1880 British cavalrymen had been armed with only carbines and swords, although some carried a lance; it was not until 1903 that the cavalry were issued rifles, the same ones used by the rest of the army, although a version of the standard infantry rifle, the shorter-barreled LEC or "Lee-Enfield Cavalry Carbine Mark I" had been introduced in 1896.

The normal peacetime British Army cavalry formation was the brigade, but twice a cavalry division had been formed. The first time was during the Anglo-Egyptian War in 1882.

The second time was during the Second Boer War (1899–1901) in South Africa, the last major conflict fought by the British Army before the First World War. During the fighting in South Africa, it was the 7,000-strong mounted contingents, not the 5,000-strong regular cavalry, that led the way in tactical development. They were better armed and more efficient, if only because they had been correctly trained to use the right weapons and tactics for the conflict.  The regular cavalry regiments were considered so unsuitable for the current conflict that General Sir Redvers Henry Buller, commanding the advance into Northern Natal, left his six cavalry regiments behind at Ladysmith, trusting in the irregular mounted forces to carry out patrols in their stead.

Their Boer opponents taught not only the cavalry but the whole army some lessons. In one engagement at Dronfield, 150 Boers held off the British cavalry division, which was then supported by several artillery batteries, and at Bergendal 74 men held up the entire British Army. So effective were their tactics that they forced the British cavalry, if only for a short time, to leave their swords and lances behind and concentrate on their firepower. This proved to the British Army the value of a full size rifle over a carbine. Soon the cavalry were practising working dismounted and advancing in open order. Their change in tactics was evidenced during the charge at Klip Drift. On their way to relieve the siege of Kimberley, the cavalry used their horses and rifles instead of swords and lances to get behind the defending Boers. The charge was later described as "an ideal cavalry operation, but not a cavalry charge as the term is generally understood." Nevertheless, it would prove to be the last time that a full British cavalry division conducted a mounted charge.

Following the Boer War there were calls for the disbandment of the cavalry by such notable persons as the Commander-in-Chief of the Forces Lord Roberts and Sir Arthur Conan Doyle. Between 1900 and 1903 the cavalry's share of the army budget was cut from six to under 4.5%, and recruiting for the cavalry was suspended for a year. Added to this, the Commonwealth Defence Act 1903 proposed a force of nine brigades formed by a militia, with six of the brigades planned to be mounted infantry known as light horse. In the same year, Lord Roberts appointed Robert Baden-Powell of the 5th Dragoon Guards to the position of Inspector General of Cavalry, a surprising choice as Roberts had earlier described him as being "certainly not a General". Within the year, Baden-Powell was endorsing a change in policy, recommending that instead of countering an enemy charge with a countercharge of their own, the cavalry should dismount and engage them with rifle fire. For cavalry to survive, by necessity British cavalry doctrine had to change, as the emphasis was now on dismounted firepower and cavalry charges that were supported by covering fire from the flanks, by their own machine guns, and the guns of the Royal Horse Artillery (RHA). To support this change in policy, cavalrymen were now required to do two hours rifle or sword practice a day. This made them just as proficient as the infantry with their rifles. In 1908 one regiment, the 14th Hussars, recorded having 354 marksmen, 212 first class shots, 35 second class, and only four third class shots.

The resulting reforms helped shape the cavalry's contribution to the British Expeditionary Force (BEF), which was established with one cavalry division supported by two brigades of horse artillery. All would be trained for the mounted charge but would also be armed with rifles, the only major power to do so. The cavalry regiments were armed with Maxim Machine Guns, although these were replaced by Vickers Machine Guns from 1912. More than anything else, the issue of entrenching tools that were carried on the troop packhorses demonstrated how much the cavalry's doctrine had changed since the Boer Wars.

Organisation

In 1914, prior to the start of the First World War, there were just over 15,000 cavalrymen serving in 31 British Army cavalry regiments. There were three Household Cavalry regiments and 28 line cavalry regiments consisting of seven dragoon guards, three dragoon, 12 hussar, and six lancer regiments.  In the British Army the term "cavalry" was only used for regular army units. The other mounted regiments in the army, which were part of the Territorial Force reserve, were the 55 yeomanry regiments and three special reserve regiments of horse. Several of the cavalry regiments, amounting to 6,000 men, were serving overseas in British India, South Africa, and Egypt. The 12 regiments based in Great Britain were assigned to four cavalry brigades, three regiments per brigade, identified as being part of the cavalry division for the BEF. After the declaration of war in August 1914, the cavalry joined the rest of the BEF in France, together with a fifth independent cavalry brigade, formed from three un-brigaded regiments then based in England. British cavalry brigades were a third larger than French and German brigades, which only had two regiments. To provide a reconnaissance force for the six infantry divisions, two regiments the 15th Hussars and the 19th Hussars were split up with one squadron being assigned to each infantry division. Also in August 1914, a 32nd regiment, the Household Cavalry Composite Regiment, was formed from three squadrons that were drawn from each of the Household Cavalry regiments; its existence proved short-lived as it was disbanded on 11 November 1914, with its manpower returning to their parent regiments.

Early in the war 24 reserve cavalry regiments were formed to provide training to recruits for the cavalry and yeomanry regiments. Only four of them saw any combat—the 6th, 8th, 9th, and 10th Reserve Cavalry Regiments—all during the 1916 Easter Rising in Dublin. The 6th Reserve Cavalry Regiment, with 35 officers and 851 other ranks, was the largest unit then available to Dublin commander Brigadier General William Lowe of the 7th Dragoon Guards.

Commanders

The cavalry were well represented among the British Army's higher ranks, with five of the ten officers who would command the five armies on the Western Front being cavalrymen. The two commanders of the BEF during the First World War, Field Marshals John French and Douglas Haig, came from the 19th Hussars and 7th Hussars respectively. William Robertson, 3rd Dragoon Guards, who rose in rank from private to field marshal, was the Quartermaster General, then Chief of Staff of the BEF before becoming the Chief of the Imperial General Staff in December 1915.

Edmund Allenby, 6th Dragoons, who started the war as the commander of the Cavalry Division, went on to command the Cavalry Corps, then V Corps, the Third Army, and the Egyptian Expeditionary Force. He was replaced as commander of the Third Army by Julian Byng, 10th Hussars, who had previously commanded the Canadian Corps. Hubert Gough of the 16th Lancers, known before the war for his involvement in the Curragh incident mutiny, started the war as a brigade commander, became the commander of the I Corps, then the Fifth Army. He was replaced by William Birdwood, 12th Lancers, who had previously commanded the Australian and New Zealand Army Corps during the Gallipoli Campaign. Charles Briggs, 1st Dragoon Guards, commanded the British Salonika Army. William Peyton, 15th Hussars, commanded the Western Desert Force during the Senussi Campaign. He later transferred to the Western Front, where he was temporarily commander of the Fifth Army before taking over command of the X Corps.

Philip Chetwood, 19th Hussars, commanded the XX Corps in Allenby's Egyptian Expeditionary Force. Charles Kavanagh, 10th Hussars, commanded the I Corps and the Cavalry Corps. Hugh Fanshaw, 19th Hussars, commanded the Cavalry Corps and the V Corps. Beauvoir De Lisle, 1st Dragoons, commanded both the XIII and XV Corps. Michael Rimington 6th Dragoons, commanded the Indian Cavalry Corps. Altogether during the First World War, the British cavalry provided ten corps and twenty-seven divisional commanders.

Divisions and brigades
The original cavalry division consisted of a 96-man headquarters, as well as 6,872 cavalrymen in four brigades, 1,682 artillerymen in four artillery batteries, 191 men in a Royal Engineers field squadron and another 206 men in the engineers signal squadron, 26 men in an Army Service Corps headquarters, and four field ambulances with 496 men. This made a total of 9,269 men, 9,518 horses, 425 wagons, 23 cars, 412 bicycles, 18 motorcycles, 24 13-pounder guns, and 24 Vickers machine guns. It was a large force when mounted, but when asked to serve dismounted, the cavalry division was only the equivalent of two weakened infantry brigades, with less artillery than an infantry division. It did, however, have a higher allocation of artillery compared to foreign cavalry divisions.

By September 1914, the cavalry division was numbered the 1st Cavalry Division. It was joined by the 2nd Cavalry Division, which had been formed on 6 September, and the 3rd Cavalry Division, formed on 29 September. By the end of the year another six British cavalry regiments (as well as artillery and support elements), which had been in India, were now in France serving in two cavalry divisions that were part of the British Indian Army. The 1st Indian Cavalry Division arrived in November and the 2nd Indian Cavalry Division in December. They were renumbered the 4th and 5th Cavalry Divisions in December 1916.  Although they were numbered, to prevent confusion with similar numbered British and Indian brigades, the latter were generally known by their names: for example, the Mhow Cavalry Brigade instead of the 5th (Mhow) Cavalry Brigade for example. The three British and two Indian cavalry divisions now came under the command of the British Cavalry Corps and the Indian Cavalry Corps.

By the end of 1915, after several occasions when the British had to temporarily dismount regiments and send them into the front lines, an establishment for the Dismounted Cavalry Division was created. The three British cavalry divisions each formed a dismounted cavalry brigade, with the 1st Brigade being raised from the 1st Division, and so on. The cavalry brigades formed a dismounted cavalry battalion, numbered after their parent brigades, so the 9th Cavalry Brigade formed the 9th Dismounted Battalion, for example. The cavalry regiments each formed one dismounted company and a machine gun section for their battalion. However, the Dismounted Cavalry Division, with only three brigades, was smaller than an infantry division, which had four brigades. This disadvantage was felt throughout the formation, with the dismounted cavalry brigade only having three battalions instead of the four in an infantry formation, and the dismounted cavalry battalion only having three, albeit larger, companies as opposed to the four of an infantry battalion. There was one other divisional-sized formation raised in 1916 that contained British cavalry regiments. This was the Imperial Cavalry Division, which served in the campaign in Mesopotamia. This was another British Indian Army division, and like all Indian divisions, it had one British regiment per brigade.

By April 1915 the British Army had formed nine cavalry brigades, serving in three cavalry divisions. A cavalry brigade headquarters had seven officers and 47 men, which controlled three cavalry regiments, a battery of six 13-pounder guns provided by the Royal Horse Artillery, and a signals troop from the Royal Engineers. When dismounted, one man in four would be assigned to hold  the horses; therefore a brigade's rifle fire was only equivalent to an infantry battalion. By now only three British cavalry regiments were not serving on the Western Front, having remained in India on internal security duties. These were the 7th Hussars, 14th Hussars, and the 21st Lancers. When the two hussar regiments left for the Mesopotamia Campaign in 1915, only one regiment, the 21st Lancers, remained. They did, however, see action on the North West Frontier, winning one of the eight Victoria Crosses awarded to British cavalrymen during the war.

In March 1916 the two cavalry corps were disbanded and the five divisions were assigned to the five British armies. A skeleton corps staff was retained to allow for the re-establishment of a new corps if one was required, which did happen the following September. At the same time, Gough was appointed as the Inspector General of Training of Cavalry Divisions. The cavalry divisions went through a period of training, re-organisation, and issuance of new equipment. One of the major changes was the withdrawal of the regiments' machine guns for their concentration in newly formed brigade machine gun squadrons, each of the 12 sections having two machine guns. The division also received a Light Armoured Car Battery equipped with six Rolls-Royce Armoured Cars. The training covered topics such as how to cross trench systems using mobile bridging equipment, tactics to employ against an entrenched enemy, blowing up and filling in trenches, and skill at arms, including machine guns and bayonet fighting.

The cavalry regiment
The 1914 British cavalry regiment was composed of 26 officers and 523 other ranks. The commanding officer was a lieutenant colonel, with a major as the second in command; other officers in the headquarters were an adjutant, quartermaster, signals officer, medical officer, and a veterinary officer. The other ranks included one warrant officer, 37 senior non commissioned officers, 22 artificers, six trumpeters, and 457 privates, or 27 officers and 598 other ranks in the regiments based in India.

Of these men, 48 were part of the regimental headquarters, and 27, armed with two Vickers Machine Guns, were assigned to the machine gun section. In 1909 the School of Musketry proposed that each regiment should have six machine guns, but this was declined for "financial reasons". The remaining 474 men were in the regiment's three squadrons, four troops per squadron. Commanded by a major with a captain as the second in command. A squadron had 158 men, six officers, a squadron sergeant major, a squadron quartermaster sergeant, eight sergeants, two trumpeters, six artificers, and 134 other ranks. Each troop had one officer, two sergeants, one artificer, and 30 other ranks. Regiments in India had four squadrons with 173 men in each squadron.

To look after the regiment's horses, attached to the regimental headquarters, was a veterinary officer, a quartermaster sergeant farrier (also responsible for killing wounded or sick horses), a saddler sergeant, and a saddle-tree maker. Each squadron had two saddlers, one a sergeant, and each troop had a shoeing smith. The regiment had 528 riding horses, 74 draught horses, six pack horses, 18 carts or horse-drawn wagons, and 15 bicycles.

British cavalry were armed with a 1908 pattern sword; lancers were armed with a  lance with a steel head mounted on an ash stave. Cavalrymen were also armed with Lee–Enfield rifles, unlike their French and German counterparts, who were only armed with a shorter range carbine. As the war progressed, the cavalrymen were issued with brodie helmets, hand grenades, trench mortars, and Hotchkiss light machine guns. The replacement of the Vickers Guns with the Hotchkiss, issued one per troop, greatly increased the firepower of the cavalry regiments. Like the infantry, cavalrymen were dressed in a khaki uniform, with a service dress cap. Instead of infantry webbing, they carried their ammunition in a bandolier. The French cuirassiers, by comparison, would not have looked out of place in the Napoleonic Wars; they still wore blue and red uniforms with breast and back metal plates and plumed brass-steel helmets. While the Germans had a standard field grey uniform, their uhlans still wore Polish style czapka helmets and tunics with plastron fronts, while the hussars wore frogged jackets and the cuirassiers had steel spiked helmets.

Casualties
Although the trench warfare on the Western Front was dominated by the artillery and infantry, the cavalry still suffered 5,674 dead and 14,630 other casualties. For comparison, one infantry regiment—the Northumberland Fusiliers—had 16,000 casualties. Unlike the huge losses in the infantry regiments, only 10 cavalry regiments suffered over 200 dead. The 3rd Dragoon Guards, with 333 dead, had the most killed, while the 7th Hussars had 80 dead, one less than the 21st Lancers, which had remained in India throughout the war. The dead included one major general, 11 brigadier generals, but only 28 of the 1,161 lieutenant colonels killed during the war were from the cavalry, several of those after having assumed command of an infantry battalion.

Aftermath

The British Army tried to learn the lessons of the First World War and incorporate them into its doctrine. In the 1920s and much of the 1930s, the General Staff tried to establish a small, mechanised, professional army; one result was the Experimental Mechanized Force. There was also a general reduction in the army, which resulted in the cavalry branch being reduced in numbers, with several famous regiments being amalgamated. In the Household Cavalry, the 1st and 2nd Life Guards became the Life Guards. In the line cavalry, sixteen regiments were amalgamated, becoming eight new regiments. The 3rd and 6th Dragoon Guards became the 3rd Carabiniers (Prince of Wales's Dragoon Guards), and the 5th Dragoon Guards and the 6th Dragoons became the 5th Royal Inniskilling Dragoon Guards. The other amalgamations used their previous regimental numbers as part of their new regimental names. The new regiments were the 4th/7th Royal Dragoon Guards,  the 13th/18th Royal Hussars, the 14th/20th King's Hussars, the 15th/19th The King's Royal Hussars, the 16th/5th The Queen's Royal Lancers, and the 17th/21st Lancers.

Although mechanisation of the British cavalry was well advanced by 1939, there was still a 1st Cavalry Division that served in the Syria–Lebanon Campaign during the Second World War. Eventually all the cavalry regiments were mechanised and became part of the Household Cavalry and the Royal Armoured Corps. There is still one regiment that retains their horses, the Household Cavalry Mounted Regiment, which together with the Household Cavalry Regiment was formed from the Life Guards and the Blues and Royals, which was itself an amalgamation of the Royal Horse Guards (Blues) and the 1st (Royal) Dragoons.

British cavalry regiments, brigades, and divisions

Other units that served in British cavalry, brigades, divisions and corps during the war

See also
 British yeomanry during the First World War
 Second line yeomanry regiments of the British Army
 British First World War cavalry generals

References
Footnotes

Citations

Bibliography

United Kingdom in World War I
British Army in World War I
British Empire in World War I
Military units and formations of the United Kingdom in World War I